Thomas Götzl (born 31 August 1990) is a Finnish football player currently playing for German Fußball-Bayernliga side FC Amberg. His father is German and his mother is Finnish.

Götzl has represented Finland 37 times at youth level.

References
  Profile at rops.fi

1990 births
Living people
Finnish footballers
Finnish expatriate footballers
Rovaniemen Palloseura players
Veikkausliiga players
Finnish people of German descent
FC Amberg players
Association football defenders